The 2018 World University Wushu Championships is the 1st World University Wushu Championship organized by the International University Sports Federation (FISU). The competition consisted of taolu and sanda events.

Medal table

Results

Men's taolu

Men's sanda

Women's taolu

Women's sanda

See also 

 Wushu at the Summer Universiade

References

External links 

 Complete Results
Official footage on YouTube by the International Wushu Federation

World University Wushu Championships
2018 in wushu (sport)
2018 in Macau sport
Wushu competitions in Macau